Cibyra magua is a species of moth of the family Hepialidae. It is known from Peru.

References

External links
Hepialidae genera

Hepialidae
Moths of South America
Moths described in 1937